Hirimaradhoo (Dhivehi: ހިރިމަރަދޫ) is one of the inhabited islands of Haa Dhaalu Atoll administrative division and geographically part of Thiladhummathi Atoll in the north of the Maldives.

Geography

Ecology
The reefs around the island is home to manta rays, reef sharks, sea turtles and an impressive amount and variety of fish. Hirimaradhoo Thila is the best-known spot for observing Rhinobatids or guitar sharks.

Demography

Governance
Hirimaradhoo was involved in the alleged 2008 election fraud in the Maldives where 50 votes were forged.

References

Maldives Culture

Islands of the Maldives